Negar Esmaeili (born 2002) is an Iranian taekwondo practitioner. She represented 2021 Asian Taekwondo Championships and claimed a gold medal in the women's Finweight, and became the second Iranian woman to become the champion of this competition.

References

External links 

Living people
2002 births
Sportspeople from Isfahan
Iranian female taekwondo practitioners